Svetlana Inamova (born 11 February 1951) is a politician in Uzbekistan. She was a deputy prime minister and head of the women's committee, and was a senator of the Upper House of the Uzbek Parliament. On 1 March 2005, she addressed the plenary session of the 49th session of the United Nations Commission on the Status of Women.  In June 2008  she was replaced as Deputy Prime Minister and head of the women's committee by Farida Akbarova.

In 2005 she was chair of the board of Special Olympics Uzbekistan, and in that role opened a conference "Commitment to Changing the Lives of Children and Young People with Different Abilities" where representatives of UN Agencies, NGOs and government bodies from the region discussed disability and sport.

 she is chair of Soglom Avlod Uchun Foundation, an international nongovernmental charity fund which "[directs its] activities to realization of humanitarian, medical, educational programs, support of talented children and propagation of a healthy life style which cover vulnerable levels of population, children and youth". In 2018, as chair of Soglom Avlod Uchun Foundation, she spoke at the First Shanghai Cooperation Organisation Forum on Women.

References

Living people
Women government ministers of Uzbekistan
21st-century Uzbekistani women politicians
Government ministers of Uzbekistan
1951 births